The 2011 Edinburgh International was held from November 25 to 27 at the Murrayfield Curling Club in Edinburgh, Scotland as part of the 2011–12 World Curling Tour. The total purse for the event was GBP£10,000, and the winner, Tom Brewster received GBP£4,000. The event was held in a round-robin format.

Teams

Round robin standings

Playoffs

External links

Official Website

2011 in curling
2011 in Scottish sport